Chhattisgarh Institute of Medical Sciences (CIMS Bilaspur) is a medical college located in Bilaspur, Chhattisgarh, India. Established in 2001, it is affiliated to Pt. Deendayal Upadhyay Memorial Health Sciences and Ayush University of Chhattisgarh and recognized by Medical Council of India.

History
CIMS Bilaspur was established in 2001 by Government of Chhattisgarh under Guru Ghasidas University. In 2007, the M.B.B.S degree was recognized by Medical Council of India and the institute become affiliated to the newly formed Ayush & Health Sciences University Chhattisgarh (now Pt. Deendayal Upadhyay Memorial Health Sciences and Ayush University of Chhattisgarh).

Academics
CIMS Bilaspur offers MBBS and Doctor of Medicine (MD). Its yearly intake is 33 students for MD/MS and 180 for MBBS.

References

External links
 

Medical colleges in Chhattisgarh
Government universities and colleges in India
Universities in Chhattisgarh
Education in Bilaspur, Chhattisgarh
Educational institutions established in 2001
2001 establishments in Chhattisgarh